Xyloschizon is a genus of fungi within the Rhytismataceae family. The genus contains two species.

.

References

External links
Xyloschizon at Index Fungorum

Leotiomycetes genera